Étude Op. 25, No. 8, in D-flat major, is a technical piano study composed by Frédéric Chopin. This etude is composed with sixths being played in both hands. The technical skill required to play it makes this etude one of the most difficult in Op.25. Its unusual sound is due to the uninterrupted succession of ascending, descending and chromatic sixths.

External links 
 
 Analysis of Chopin Etudes at Chopin: the poet of the piano
 Op. 25, No. 8 played by Alfred Cortot
 Op. 25, No. 8 played by Claudio Arrau
 Op. 25, No. 8 played by Sviatoslav Richter
 Op. 25, No. 8 played by György Cziffra
 Op. 25, No. 8 played by Vladimir Ashkenazy
 Op. 25, No. 8 played by Maurizio Pollini
 Op. 25, No. 8 played by Grigory Sokolov

25 08
1834 compositions
Compositions in D-flat major